Peter Feldstein (May 24, 1942 – December 1, 2017) was an American photographer and a Professor Emeritus at the University of Iowa.

Life
He graduated from University of Iowa, with a Master's degree. 
His work can be seen in such galleries as Olson-Larsen  in Des Moines, Roy Boyd in Chicago, Lieberman & Saul in New York City, Leedy-Voulkos in Kansas City, Thomas Barry Fine Arts in Minneapolis, and Richard E. Peeler Art Center at DePauw University. He also has a National Endowment for the Arts grant and two Iowa Arts Council grants with two more from Polaroid Collection.

In his The Oxford Project, he photographed people in Oxford, Iowa.

Works

References

External links 
https://art.uiowa.edu/people/peter-feldstein

1942 births
2017 deaths
American photographers